Northgate Shopping Centre is a shopping centre in Greater Johannesburg, South Africa. It is located in Northgate, Randburg.
It has one of the few remaining functioning ice-rinks in the area.
It also houses the WeBuyCars Dome on the premises, a primary venue for entertainment, expos and concerts in northern Johannesburg.

External links
 Official site
 The Dome website

Shopping centres in Johannesburg